The Morning Star is a newspaper that serves the Vernon, British Columbia metropolitan area and North Okanagan area of Canada. Owned by Black Press since December 1988, The Morning Star was founded in June 1988.

See also
List of newspapers in Canada

References

External links
The Morning Star official website

Black Press newspapers
Publications established in 1988
Vernon, British Columbia
Mass media in the Okanagan
Daily newspapers published in British Columbia
1988 establishments in British Columbia